Gweilo Beer is a craft brewery founded in July 2014 in Hong Kong. It released its first beer in June 2015.

Meaning: Gweilo or gwailou is a common Cantonese slur term for Westerners. In the absence of modifiers, it refers to white people and literally translates to "ghost people".

Gweilo Beer produces a pale ale and an IPA. Gweilo Beer's recipes were created for the Hong Kong market, and both beers are English-style session beers coming in at 4.5% and 4.8% ABV, respectively. The Gweilo IPA won Best British Style (there are no gold medals) at the 2015 Hong Kong International Beer Awards.

In September 2015, Gweilo Beer started to export to Macau and China, and is expected to export to other foreign markets.

See also
 Beer in Hong Kong
 Gweilo

References

Breweries
Beer in Hong Kong